The Hekou Group is a geological group in Gansu Province, China. It is Early Cretaceous in age.  Dinosaur body fossils have also been recovered from the Hekou Group, including the iguanodont Lanzhousaurus and the titanosaurs Daxiatitan, Huanghetitan and Yongjinglong, and the nodosaur Taohelong. Fossil eggs are rare, but one oogenus, Polyclonoolithus, was discovered in the Hekou Group. The group spans the Valanginian to Albian and can be subdivided into four formations. Fossil pterosaur tracks have been recovered.

Vertebrate paleofauna

Pterosaurs 

Sinamia lanzhoensis amiiform fish

References

See also 
 List of fossil sites
 List of dinosaur bearing rock formations

Geologic groups of Asia
Geologic formations of China
Lower Cretaceous Series of Asia
Cretaceous China
Ichnofossiliferous formations
Ooliferous formations